Electrohomeopathy, Electrohomoeopathy, or Mattei cancer cure is a derivative of homeopathy invented in the 19th century by Count Cesare Mattei. The name is derived from a combination of electro (referring to an electric bio-energy content supposedly extracted from plants and of therapeutic value, rather than electricity in its conventional sense) and homeopathy (referring to an alternative medicinal philosophy developed by Samuel Hahnemann in the 18th century). Electrohomeopathy has been defined as the combination of electrical devices and homeopathy.

Lucrative for its inventor and popular in the late nineteenth century, electrohomeopathy has been described as "utter idiocy". Like traditional homeopathy, it is regarded by the medical and scientific communities as pseudoscience and its practice as quackery.

History and criticism
Electrohomeopathy was devised by Cesare Mattei (1809–1896) in the latter part of the 19th century. Mattei, a nobleman living in a castle in the vicinity of Bologna, studied natural science, anatomy, physiology, pathology, chemistry and botany. He ultimately focused on the supposed therapeutic power of "electricity" in botanical extracts. Massei made bold, unsupported claims for the efficacy of his treatments, including the claim that his treatments offered a nonsurgical alternative to cancer. His treatment regimens were met with scepticism by mainstream medicine:The electrohomeopathic system is an invention of Count Mattei who prates of "red," "blue," and "green" electricity, a theory that, in spite of its utter idiocy, has attracted a considerable following and earned a large fortune for its chief promoter.

Notwithstanding criticisms, including a challenge by the British medical establishment to the claimed success of his cancer treatments, electrohomeopathy (or Matteism, as it was sometimes known at the time) had adherents in Germany, France, the USA and the UK by the beginning of the 20th century; electrohomeopathy had been the subject of approximately 100 publications and there were three journals dedicated to it.

Philosophy
Remedies are derived from what are said to be the active micro nutrients or mineral salts of certain plants. One contemporary account of the process of producing electrohomeopathic remedies was as follows:As to the nature of his remedies we learn...that...they are manufactured from certain herbs, and that the directions for the preparation of the necessary dilutions are given in the ordinary jargon of homeopathy. The globules and liquids, however, are " instinct with a potent, vital, electrical force, which enables them to work wonders." This process of "fixing the electrical principle" is carried on in the secret central chamber of a Neo-Moorish castle which Count Mattei has built for himself in the Bolognese Apennines...The "red electricity" and "white electricity" supposed to be "fixed" in these "vegetable compounds" are in their very nomenclature and suggestion poor and miserable fictions.

According to Mattei's own ideas however, every disease originates in the change of blood or of the lymphatic system or both, and remedies can therefore be mainly divided into two broad categories groups to be used in response to the dominant affected system. Mattei wrote that having obtained plant extracts, he was "able to determine in the liquid vegetable electricity". Allied to his theories and therapies were elements of Chinese medicine, of medical humours, of apparent Brownianism, as well as modified versions of Samuel Hahnemann's homeopathic principles. Electrohomeopathy has some associations with spagyric medicine, a holistic medical philosophy claimed to be the practical application of alchemy in medical treatment, so that the principle of modern electrohomeopathy is that disease is typically multi-organic in cause or effect and therefore requires holistic treatment that is at once both complex and natural.

Modern usage
A symposium took place in Bologna in 2008 to mark the 200th anniversary of the birth of Cesare Mattei, with attendees from India, Pakistan, Germany UK, and the USA. Electrohomeopathy is practised predominantly in India and Pakistan (although it is not a recognised healthcare discipline in India), but there are also a number of electrohomeopathy organisations and institutions worldwide.

See also
List of ineffective cancer treatments

References

Further reading
Mattei, Count Cesare The Principles of Electrohomoeopathy: a new science, 1880 
Gliddon, Aurelius J L Stepping Stones to Electro-Homoeopathy, 1892 (reprinted 2010) 
Krauss, Theodor Die grundgelete der-Elektro homöopathie , 1921

Homeopathy
Pseudoscience
Health fraud
Alternative cancer treatments